Saama Chakeba is a Hindu festival, originating from the Mithilaregion of the Indian subcontinent. It is a festival of unity. It is celebrated in November and commences when birds begin their migration from the Himalayas down towards the plains of India. According to the Hindustan Times, the festival, which includes folk theater and song, celebrates the love between brothers and sisters and is based on a legend recounted in the Puranas.

Mythological significance 
It tells the story of Sama, a daughter of Krishna who had been falsely accused of wrongdoing. Her father punished her by turning her into a bird, but the love and sacrifice of her brother Chakeva eventually allowed her to regain human form.

Celebration 
The celebration starts from the night of Chhath puja. This is the 7th day of the month of Kartik. Young, mostly unmarried girls assemble near the ghats of chhath with a basket containing small idols of sama and chakeva, candles, kohl, clay made daily use appliances etc. at night. 

They sing traditional songs, perform some rituals, like making kohl, exchanging baskets. This celebration continues till Kartik Purnima. On the auspicious occasion of Kartik Purnima, girls take a dip in river and the idols of sama and chakeva are immersed in the river.

References

Festivals in Bihar
Customs involving siblings

Festivals in Nepal
Mithila
Culture of Madhesh